The Macatawa River, also known as the Black River, is located in the lower part of Ottawa County, Michigan, which drains into Lake Macatawa and eventually into Lake Michigan.

The name Macatawa is a mis-phoneticization of the Native American "Muck-i-ta-wog-go-me", which means "black water". The region was inhabited by Ottawas, Chippewas and Potawatomie tribes prior to European Settlement.

The Macatawa River Greenway is a corridor of land along the river including a number of private and public parcels that provides a green highway for wildlife and recreational opportunities for people along the water. Land along the Macatawa River open to the public includes: Upper Macatawa Natural Area, Hawthorn Pond, Adams Street Landing, Ridge Point Community Church Natural Area, Paw Paw Park, Windmill Island, Window on the Waterfront Park, Dunton Park, Kollen Park and Holland State Park.

A number of entities contribute to the management of the public areas along the Macatawa River Greenway including: Outdoor Discovery Center Macatawa Greenway (non-profit), Ottawa County Parks and Recreation Commission, City of Holland, Zeeland Township, Holland Township and Park Township.

See also 
 Lake Macatawa

References 

Rivers of Michigan
Rivers of Allegan County, Michigan
Rivers of Ottawa County, Michigan
Tributaries of Lake Michigan